"Hole in One" is an episode of the BBC sitcom, Only Fools and Horses. It was the third episode of series 4 and was first broadcast on 7 March 1985. In the episode, Del decides to sue the brewery after Uncle Albert falls down the Nag's Head cellar.

Synopsis
Albert has been living with Del Boy and Rodney for four weeks, and their finances are low. It is the "worst winter in over two million years", and Rodney has impulsively made an investment in £500 worth of suntan lotion. To make matters worse, that £500 was the last of the Trotters' money.

At The Nag's Head, as the Trotters pass by the open door into its cellar, it is revealed that Mike is after Del due to a malfunctioning deep-fat fryer he sold him. Inside, Del and Rodney once again start to fight about their money problems, prompting Albert to leave.

Suddenly, a loud crash is heard, and the Trotter Brothers run into the cellar to find that Albert has fallen through the cellar's open door, injuring Mike in the process. Del hatches a plan when Albert says, "I've got a right mind to sue the brewery!" He also tells Rodney to phone Solly Attwell, the Trotter family's solicitor.

Back at Nelson Mandela House, Solly informs Del and Rodney that Albert has sustained no physical injuries from his fall but suggests that he may have suffered mentally. Furthermore, he informs them that the brewery has offered a £2,000 out of court settlement, an amount which will solve their financial troubles, but Del still decides to take the case to court in the hope of gaining more compensation.

In court, Del and Rodney tell their sides of the story, hoping that they get their money from this, but when Albert is called up to tell his side of the story, the brewery's barrister mentions a number of similar cases involving an Albert Gladstone Trotter and all taking place after the war. Not only that, but it is also revealed that Albert underwent basic parachute training on the Isle of Wight, where he learned how to fall without hurting himself. The case is thrown out.

Outside court, it is revealed that Albert has fifteen previous lawsuits for falling down holes (not including, as Del notes, out of court settlements), gaining the nickname of "The Ferret" in the process. An irate Del and Rodney confront Albert, with Rodney explaining that he was nearly prosecuted for contempt of court, Del's name has been passed on to the Director of Public Prosecutions, and Solly is likely to be struck off. Albert explains that whenever he and Grandad were short of money, Albert would fall down a hole. The reason Albert fell down the cellar at the Nag's Head to gain compensation was to repay his nephews for the hospitality they had shown him, and most of all, to pay for Grandad's headstone. When they were children, Grandad used to defend Albert, and Albert never got the chance to pay his older brother back. Del and Rodney, sympathising with the situation, forgive Albert and begin to wheel him home in his wheelchair. A few moments later, Del stops and loudly reminds Albert that he can still walk.

Episode cast

Production 
Actor Lennard Pearce died from a heart attack soon after filming of the fourth series got underway and had already filmed several scenes for "Hole in One". John Sullivan wrote two new episodes, "Happy Returns" and "Strained Relations", the latter of which featured Grandad's funeral. Once Buster Merryfield joined the cast, the "Hole in One" scenes already filmed by Pearce were reshot. The rest of the original footage has never been transmitted, and is not available on DVD. A still black and white photo of a scene involving Pearce, in which he is in a wheelchair outside the court house has been in existence.

This was the first episode to include Buster Merryfield in the second version of the opening credits.
This version would remain right up to and including the 1996 episode "Time on Our Hands."

Story arc 
The Trotter family's address is revealed to be 368 Nelson Mandela House, Dockside Estate, Peckham.
Albert's middle name is revealed to be "Gladstone".

Episode concept
The idea for the script was based on a true story about John Sullivan's grandfather, a coal-man named Dickie, who claimed compensation by falling down holes.

References

External links

Only Fools and Horses (series 4) episodes
1985 British television episodes